Druidstone: The Secret of the Menhir Forest is a tactical role-playing game developed and published by Ctrl Alt Ninja for Windows on May 15, 2019.

Gameplay
Druidstone is a story driven, party-scale isometric tactical role-playing game with a focus on grid-based combat.

Plot
The game takes place in the fantasy world of Elo Sphaera and follows main characters Leonhard, Aava, and Oiko on their journey.

Release
Ctrl Alt Ninja was founded by the co-creators of the Legend of Grimrock series in 2015. The development of Druidstone started in autumn 2016. The game was announced on April 15, 2017. In November 2018, the release date was announced for spring 2019. In April 2019, a release date was announced for May 15, 2019. The game was originally planned to be procedurally generated but was changed to handcrafted missions. The game was also released with a level editor and modding tools.

Reception

Druidstone received "generally favorable" reviews according to review aggregator Metacritic.

Nate Crowley of Rock Paper Shotgun said that "As it is, this is a perfectly reasonable portion of carefully planned fantasy stabbing, which was enough fun (once I started playing properly, at least) to make me reevaluate my whole position on puzzle elements in tactical games."

Greg Delmage of RPGFan summarized: "Although the story and characters are nothing new to RPGs, the strategy gameplay systems truly stand out in their seemingly simple execution."

Bryan Vitale of RPG Site said that "Druidstone is a perfect entry point for RPG fans that are interested in this style of tactical game without having to invest several dozens of hours in a longer experience that they may not enjoy. It doesn't offer a lot in terms of unique themes or robust storytelling, but it's balanced out by an impressive variety of encounter designs and flexibility for different playstyles. On top of these strengths, it also offers some surprisingly good musical scores and environmental art. It's a strong overall package that, while brief, was a joy to play through."

Rock Paper Shotgun ranked Druidstone 35th on its "best strategy games on PC" list in 2020.

References

External links
 (archived)

2019 video games
Fantasy video games
Indie video games
Single-player video games
Tactical role-playing video games
Video games developed in Finland
Video games with isometric graphics
Video games with Steam Workshop support
Windows games
Windows-only games